Eliza Kate Coupe (born April 6, 1981) is an American actress, comedian and model, known for playing Jane Kerkovich-Williams in the ABC comedy series Happy Endings, Denise "Jo" Mahoney in the final two seasons of the medical comedy-drama Scrubs, her starring role as Tiger on the Hulu comedy series Future Man, and her recurring role as Hannah Wyland in Quantico. She starred in the Fox comedy Pivoting in 2022. She had a supporting role in the Netflix series Murderville, episode Who Killed Santa. Most recently, she has had a reoccurring role on the CBS legal drama So Help Me Todd.

Early life
Coupe was born and raised in Plymouth, New Hampshire to Ernest and Kathryn. She has two brothers, Sam and Thom. She attended Plymouth Regional High School in her hometown and graduated in 1999. She is of French, English and Scottish heritage.

Coupe was active in her high school's theatre program. Her roles included Bonnie in Anything Goes and a Mundy sister in Dancing at Lughnasa. She graduated from California Institute of the Arts (CalArts) in 2006.

Career
After college, Coupe took classes in improvisational comedy at The Groundlings and ImprovOlympic. In 2003, she toured France playing a soldier in an all-female version of King Lear. In November 2005, her one-woman sketch show The Patriots premiered at the Upright Citizens Brigade Theatre in New York and won her the Breakout Performer Award at HBO's U.S. Comedy Arts Festival in Aspen, Colorado in March 2006.

In 2007, she appeared in I Think I Love My Wife. She appeared in the short-lived MTV series Short Circuitz. She was in "Girlfriends", episode 8 of the first season of Flight of the Conchords; and in an episode of Unhitched. She was a series regular in HBO's unaired 12 Miles of Bad Road and had a recurring role in Samantha Who?

She had a recurring role as Dr. Denise "Jo" Mahoney in Season 8 of the TV series Scrubs and the companion web series Scrubs: Interns. She was made a regular in Season 9, the final season of the series.

In March 2009, Coupe was cast as Callie in the ABC pilot, No Heroics, an adaptation of the UK series of the same name. In 2012, she played the female lead and love interest to Daniel Henney in the independent film Shanghai Calling, filmed in Shanghai, China. She also appeared in the 2011 movie What's Your Number? with Anna Faris and Chris Evans.

From April 2011 to May 2013, Coupe starred on the ABC ensemble comedy series Happy Endings alongside Elisha Cuthbert, Zachary Knighton, Adam Pally, Damon Wayans, Jr. and Casey Wilson. Despite critical acclaim and a cult following, the show was cancelled by ABC after concluding its third season on May 3, 2013. Since Happy Endings'''s cancellation, She played a recurring role in the third season of House of Lies and starred alongside Jay Harrington in the USA Network comedy series Benched, which premiered on October 28, 2014. She later starred in the ABC thriller Quantico playing the recurring role of FBI agent Hannah Wyland.

Coupe also starred as Tiger on the Hulu comedy series Future Man, which premiered November 14, 2017. The third and final season aired in 2020.

In April 2020, she was cast as Amy in the Fox comedy series Pivoting''. It debuted on January 9, 2022 with positive reviews, but the show was cancelled after one season.

Personal life
Coupe was married to acting teacher and puppeteer Randall Whittinghill from December 2007 to June 2013.

She announced her engagement to Darin Olien, founder of lifestyle brand SuperLife, via Instagram on November 27, 2014. They were married on December 24, 2014 while on vacation in New Zealand. They filed for divorce in 2018.

Coupe was diagnosed with dyslexia and ADHD in childhood.

Filmography

Film

Television

References

External links

1981 births
Living people
Actresses from New Hampshire
American film actresses
American television actresses
American women comedians
American people of French descent
American people of English descent
American people of Scottish descent
California Institute of the Arts alumni
People from Plymouth, New Hampshire
21st-century American actresses
Comedians from New Hampshire
21st-century American comedians